Pamela Anne Matson (born 1953) is an American scientist and professor. From 2002 - 2017 she was the dean of the Stanford University School of Earth, Energy & Environmental Sciences. She also previously worked at NASA and at the University of California Berkeley. She is the Richard and Rhoda Goldman Professor in Environmental Studies and a Senior Fellow at the Woods Institute for the Environment. Matson is a winner of the prestigious MacArthur Fellowship, also known as the "genius grant," and is considered to be a "pioneer in the field of environmental science."  She was appointed to the "Einstein Professorship" of the Chinese Academy of Sciences in 2011. She received an honorary doctorate from McGill University in 2017. She is married to fellow scientist Peter Vitousek.

Early life and education
Pamela Matson grew up in Hudson, Wisconsin. She studied biology at the University of Wisconsin-Eau Claire. After graduation Matson started a career that would center on environmental issues. She completed her M.S. from the School of Public and Environmental Affairs at the Indiana University, her PhD in Forest Ecology from Oregon State University, and did postdoctoral research at the University of North Carolina.

Work
Matson's first job was at the NASA Ames Research Center where she studied the atmosphere above the Amazon Rainforest with emphasis on the way deforestation and pollution affected the environment. After her time with NASA, Matson joined the Environmental Science Policy Management Program at the University of California, Berkeley, where she collaborated in trying to promote a community of academics interested in environmental issues. Matson eventually became the dean of the School of Earth Sciences at Stanford. There she started a sustainability roundtable to bring people together to discuss environmental issues. Matson was selected as a MacArthur Fellow, and in 1997 was elected as a Fellow of the American Association for the Advancement of Science. In 2002 she was named the Burton and Deedee McMurtry University Fellow in Undergraduate Education at Stanford. The "Matson Sustainability Science Research Laboratory" at Stanford is named after her.
She was the editor of the journal Annual Review of Environment and Resources. from 2003 to 2008.

Honors
Ames Associate Fellow (1992)
Fellow of the American Academy of Arts and Sciences (1992)
NASA Exceptional Service Medal (1993)
United States National Academy of Sciences (1994)
MacArthur Fellowship (1995–2000)
University of Wisconsin-Eau Claire Distinguished Alumni Award (1996)
Fellow of the American Association for the Advancement of Science (1997)
Oregon State University Distinguished Alumni Award (1998)
McMurtrey Fellow for Undergraduate Education

References

External links
Pamela Matson's profile 
Matson Sustainability Science Research Laboratory

1953 births
Living people
Stanford University School of Earth Sciences faculty
MacArthur Fellows
University of Wisconsin–Eau Claire alumni
Oregon State University alumni
Fellows of the American Academy of Arts and Sciences
American earth scientists
Members of the United States National Academy of Sciences
Women earth scientists
American women scientists
People from Hudson, Wisconsin
Fellows of the Ecological Society of America
Annual Reviews (publisher) editors
21st-century American women